Borodino is a rural locality (a village) in Paustovskoye Rural Settlement, Vyaznikovsky District, Vladimir Oblast, Russia. The population was 14 as of 2010.

Geography 
Borodino is located 22 km south of Vyazniki (the district's administrative centre) by road. Uspensky Pogost is the nearest rural locality.

References 

Rural localities in Vyaznikovsky District